The 2010 California Insurance Commissioner election was held on November 2, 2010, to choose the Insurance Commissioner of California. The primary election was held on June 8, 2010. Incumbent Insurance Commissioner Steve Poizner, a Republican, ran for Governor of California and did not seek reelection. Democratic Assemblyman Dave Jones defeated Republican Michael Villines in the general election.

Candidates 
The following were certified by the California Secretary of State as candidates in the primary election for Insurance Commissioner. Candidates who won their respective primaries and qualified for the general election are shown in bold.

American Independent 
 Clay Pedersen, retail manager

Democratic 
 Hector De La Torre, California State Assemblyman from the 50th district
 Dave Jones, California State Assemblyman from the 9th district

Green 
 William Balderston, teacher and union organizer

Libertarian 
 Richard Bronstein, insurance broker

Peace and Freedom 
 Dina Padilla, injured worker consultant

Republican 
 Brian FitzGerald, attorney
 Mike Villines, California State Assemblyman from the 29th district and former Assembly Minority Leader

Primary results

Democratic

Republican

Others

General election results

References

External links

Official campaign websites 
 William Balderston
 Hector De La Torre
 Brian FitzGerald
 Dave Jones
 Dina Josephine Padilla
 Mike Villines

Insurance Commissioner
California Insurance Commissioner elections
California